Elsa Buchanan (22 December 1908 – 17 January 2004) was an English character actress with a brief career in theatre and film.

Born Elsie Winifred Buchanan Tinker, Buchanan made her stage debut at age three at the Palace Theatre, London at a performance attended by Queen Mary. Buchanan was later the first Briton admitted to the training school of the Académie française.

She made seventeen films in the United States, where she was noted for her blonde hair and called "the girl with the largest eyes and the smallest waist in Hollywood." She accepted the proposal of her husband, a merchant sailor named Noll Charlton, while attending a coronation ball for King George VI and retired from film thereafter.

Shortly before her death, she saw Gosford Park, in which one of the characters, a Hollywood producer, discusses casting for Charlie Chan in London, inviting a blonde maid to audition for the part that she actually played in that film.

Filmography

References

External links

English film actresses
English people of Scottish descent
Actresses from London
British expatriates in the United States
1908 births
2004 deaths
English child actresses
English stage actresses